Nils Gabriel Sefström (2 June 1787 – 30 November 1845) was a Swedish chemist. Sefström was a student of Berzelius and, when studying the brittleness of steel in 1830, he rediscovered a new chemical element, to which he gave the name vanadium.

Vanadium was first discovered by the Spanish-Mexican mineralogist Andrés Manuel del Río in 1801.  He named it erythronium.  Friedrich Wöhler later confirmed that vanadium and erythronium were the same substance.

Sefström was member of the Royal Swedish Academy of Sciences from 1815.

The Spitzbergen glacier Sefströmbreen, and the mountain ridge of Sefströmkammen, are named after him.

References

Further reading 

   - subscription required
   - subscription required
 Svenskt biografiskt handlexikon: Sefström, Nils Gabriel - in Swedish

1787 births
1845 deaths
Swedish chemists
Uppsala University alumni
Discoverers of chemical elements
Members of the Royal Swedish Academy of Sciences
19th-century Swedish scientists
19th-century chemists
Vanadium